James G. Fogarty (February 12, 1864 – May 20, 1891) was an American professional baseball outfielder. He played in Major League Baseball from 1884 to 1890 for the Philadelphia Quakers and Philadelphia Athletics.  He led the National League in stolen bases in 1889.  He was signed by the Quakers based on a recommendation by Jerry Denny to Quakers manager Harry Wright.

Fogarty was known to win money from teammates playing poker.

An alumnus of Saint Mary's College of California, Fogarty died of tuberculosis at the age of 27 in Philadelphia.

See also
 List of baseball players who died during their careers
 List of Major League Baseball annual stolen base leaders
 List of Major League Baseball career stolen bases leaders
List of Major League Baseball player-managers

References

1864 births
1891 deaths
Major League Baseball outfielders
National League stolen base champions
Philadelphia Quakers players
Philadelphia Athletics (PL) players
Philadelphia Athletics (PL) managers
Saint Mary's Gaels baseball players
19th-century baseball players
Baseball players from San Francisco
San Francisco Niantic players
San Francisco Woonsocket players
San Francisco Reddingtons players
San Francisco Haverlys players
Major League Baseball player-managers
19th-century deaths from tuberculosis
Tuberculosis deaths in Pennsylvania